Pontibacillus salipaludis is a Gram-positive, slightly halophilic, facultatively anaerobic, rod-shaped, endospore-forming and motile bacterium from the genus of Pontibacillus which has been isolated from a salt pan from Tuticorin in India.

References

External links
Type strain of Pontibacillus salipaludis at BacDive -  the Bacterial Diversity Metadatabase

 

Bacillaceae
Bacteria described in 2016